Nancy Atherton is an American writer and author of the Aunt Dimity mystery novel series, which presently extends to twenty-four volumes.

Atherton lives in Colorado Springs, Colorado.

Aunt Dimity series

The series follows the adventures of American Lori Shepherd and her growing family as she resolves mysteries with the help of her deceased benefactor, Aunt Dimity, who communicates with her from the spirit world by means of a blue leather-bound writing journal. The primary setting is the fictitious village of Finch in the Cotswolds of England and include most of the population in supporting roles, but several books are set in other locales in the United Kingdom or abroad.

Each book contains a recipe for a bread or pastry which is integral to the story.

Listed in chronological order (except for Aunt Dimity and the Duke, which serves as a series prequel) and by Series No. of Publication:

 Aunt Dimity's Death (1992) New York: Penguin Group USA ; . Voted "One of the Century's 100 Favorite Mysteries" by the Independent Mystery Booksellers Association.  Featured recipe: Beth's Oatmeal Cookies.
 Aunt Dimity and the Duke (1994) nominated for the Dilys Award by the Independent Mystery Booksellers Association, New York: Penguin USA 1995 ; .  Featured recipe: Nell's Strawberry Tarts.
 Aunt Dimity's Good Deed (1996) New York: Penguin USA ; .  Featured recipe: Uncle Tom's Butterscotch Brownies.
 Aunt Dimity Digs In (1998) New York: Penguin Group ; .  Featured recipe: Lilian's Lemon Bars.
 Aunt Dimity's Christmas (1999) New York: Penguin Group USA ; ; .  Featured recipe: Angel Cookies.
 Aunt Dimity Beats the Devil (2000) New York: Penguin Group USA ; .  Featured recipe: Claire's Lace Cookies.
 Aunt Dimity: Detective (September 30, 2001) New York: Penguin Books ; .  Featured recipe: The Pym Sisters' Gingerbread.
 Aunt Dimity Takes a Holiday (May 4, 2003) New York: Viking ; .  Featured recipe: Winnie's Treacle Tart.
 Aunt Dimity: Snowbound (June 23, 2004) City: Penguin (Non-Classics) ; .  Featured recipe: Catchpole's Apricot Compote.
 Aunt Dimity and the Next of Kin (2005) New York: Viking, ; .  Featured recipe: Miss Beacham's Raisin Bread.
 Aunt Dimity and the Deep Blue Sea (2006) New York: Viking ; .  Featured recipe: Sir Percy's Favorite Sticky Lemon Cake.
 Aunt Dimity Goes West City: Penguin (Non-Classics) (2005) ; ; .  Featured recipe: Carrie Vyne's Calico Cookies.
 Aunt Dimity: Vampire Hunter (2008) New York: Viking Press ; .  Featured recipe: Charlotte's Jammy Biscuits.
 Aunt Dimity Slays the Dragon (2009) New York: Viking Press ; .  Featured recipe: King Wilfred's Honey Cakes.
 Aunt Dimity Down Under 224 pages New York: Viking Adult (February 18, 2010) ; . Featured recipe: Donna's Anzac Biscuits
 Aunt Dimity and the Family Tree 229 pages New York: Viking Adult (February 17, 2011) ; . Featured recipe: Aunt Dimity's Seed Cake
 Aunt Dimity and the Village Witch 232 pages New York: Viking Adult (April 26, 2012) ; . Featured recipe: Amelia Thistle's Brown Bread
 Aunt Dimity and the Lost Prince 256 pages New York: Viking Adult (April 18, 2013) ; . Featured recipe: Mama Markov's Russian Tea Cakes
 Aunt Dimity and the Wishing Well 288 pages New York: Viking (April 17, 2014) . Featured recipe: Sally Pyne's Summer Pudding
 Aunt Dimity and the Summer King 240 pages New York: Viking (April 14, 2015) . Featured recipe: Harriet's Pinwheel Cookies
 Aunt Dimity and the Buried Treasure 231 pages New York: Viking (2016) .  Featured recipe: Eggless Fruit Cake
 Aunt Dimity and the Widow's Curse (2017) 240 pages New York: Viking (2017) .  Featured recipe: Minnie's Melting Moments
 Aunt Dimity and the King's Ransom (2018) 240 pages New York: Viking (2018) .  Featured recipe: Steve's Apple Crumble
Aunt Dimity and the Heart of Gold (2019) 240 pages New York Viking (June 18, 2019) . 

Also: Introducing Aunt Dimity, Paranormal Detective (2009, New York: Viking Press ), an omnibus edition reprinting the first two books in the series (Aunt Dimity's Death and Aunt Dimity and the Duke)

Other works
She has also contributed to one novel, titled  along with thirteen other authors.

Bibliography

Footnotes

References

External links
Aunt Dimity's World, Nancy T. Atherton home page.

American mystery writers
American women novelists
20th-century American novelists
Living people
21st-century American novelists
Writers from Colorado Springs, Colorado
Women mystery writers
20th-century American women writers
21st-century American women writers
Novelists from Colorado
Year of birth missing (living people)